Toast is sliced bread that has been browned by exposure to radiant heat. It appears as a main ingredient in many dishes, often as a base on which other food is served.

Toast dishes

 Avocado toast – mashed avocado on toast. A variety of additional ingredients can be used.
 Beans on toast – Today, baked beans are a staple convenience food in the UK, often eaten as part of the modern full English breakfast and particularly on toast (called simply 'beans on toast')
 Bruschetta – an antipasto (starter dish) from Italy consisting of grilled bread rubbed with garlic and topped with olive oil and salt. Variations may include toppings of tomato, vegetables, beans, cured meat, or cheese.
 Cheese on toast – a snack made by placing cheese on slices of bread and melting the cheese under a grill. It is a simple meal, popular in the United Kingdom.
 Chipped beef on toast – typically consists of a white sauce and rehydrated slivers of dried beef, served on toasted bread. It was a common dish in U.S. army mess halls during World War II, at which time it was given the nickname "shit on a shingle".
Cinnamon toast – buttered bread, covered in a mix of cinnamon and sugar, and toasted in an oven.
 Creamed eggs on toast – consists of toast or American-style biscuits covered in a gravy made from bechamel sauce and chopped hard-boiled eggs
 Crostino –  an Italian appetizer consisting of small slices of grilled or toasted bread and toppings
 Egg in the basket – is an egg fried in a hole made in a slice of bread
 French toast – bread soaked in milk, then in beaten eggs and then fried
 Garlic bread – consists of bread (usually a baguette or sour dough like a ciabatta), topped with garlic and olive oil or butter and may include additional herbs, like chives. It is then either grilled or broiled until toasted, or baked in a conventional or bread oven.	
 Kaya toast – a traditional Singaporean breakfast item and well known snack in Malaysia, it is toast topped with kaya (coconut jam), a topping of sugar, coconut milk and eggs, pandan, and sometimes margarine or butter. Crackers are also sometimes used instead of toast.
 Melba toast – a dry, crisp and thinly sliced toast, often served with soup and salad or topped with either melted cheese or pâté
 Mince on toast – consists of cooked ground meat on a slice of toasted bread.
 Milk toast – a breakfast food consisting of toasted bread in warm milk, typically with sugar and butter.
 Ogura toast – a popular Japanese toast variety that originated in Nagoya's café scene in the 1920s. Ogura jam and butter are spread on thick toast.
 Pa amb tomàquet – a simple and typical recipe in Catalan cuisine consisting of bread, which may or may not be toasted, with tomato rubbed on it and seasoned with olive oil and salt. Various additional toppings may be added, such as cheese, anchovies and ham.
 Roti bakar – an Indonesian breakfast dish consisting of two slices of bread and a sweet filling.
 Shrimp toast – a Chinese dim sum dish made from small triangles of bread, brushed with egg and coated with minced shrimp and water chestnuts, then cooked by baking or deep frying.
 Soldiers – thin strips of toast; the strips that a slice is cut into are reminiscent of soldiers on parade. The toast is sliced in this manner so that it can be dipped into a soft-boiled egg that has had the top of its shell removed.
 Toast Hawaii – an open sandwich consisting of a slice of toast with ham and cheese, and a maraschino cherry in the middle of a pineapple
 Toast sandwich – a sandwich made by putting a thin slice of toast between two thin slices of bread with a layer of butter, and adding salt and pepper to taste
 Toast Skagen – a Swedish starter and food dish consisting of two pieces of toasted bread, mayonnaise, and prawns
 Toastie - an enclosed hot sandwich, which uses a pie iron/sandwich toastie maker
 Tongue toast – an historic traditional open sandwich prepared with sauteed beef tongue and scrambled eggs, it was sometimes served on buttered toast with a poached egg instead of a scrambled one.
  Welsh rarebit - a dish consisting of a hot cheese-based sauce served over slices of toasted bread.

See also

 Crouton
 Fried bread
 Isaac Toast – a chain of toast restaurants based in South Korea, with over 700 retail stores in South Korea
 Killiney Kopitiam – a Singapore-based chain of mass-market, traditional kopitiam styled service cafes selling toast products (notably kaya toast), soft-boiled eggs and coffee
 List of bread dishes
 Sop
 Toast point 
 Toast rack
 Toaster pastry
 Tostada (toast) – a term used in some Hispanic American countries to name several different traditional local dishes which have in common that they are toasted or use a toasted ingredient as the main base of their preparation
 Ya Kun Kaya Toast – a Singaporean chain of mass-market, retro-ambience cafes selling toast products (notably kaya toast), soft-boiled eggs and coffee

References

External links
 

 
Toast